Evangelicalism is of the minor Christian denominations in the Philippines and is the fourth most widespread, followed closely by Iglesia ni Cristo and Hinduism. 

According to the 2000 Census, 2.8% of Filipinos identified as Evangelicals. This figure has risen to 14% as of 2017. 

The Philippine Council of Evangelical Churches (PCEC), an organization of more than seventy Evangelical and Mainline Protestant churches, and more than 210 parachurch organizations in the Philippines, counts more than 11 million members as of 2011.

Population and organizations 

Overseas Filipinos from the Philippines have settled abroad and spread their religion, including Evangelicalism. The UAE, a country with many OFWs, has about four Evangelical churches.

The following table shows the percentage of Filipino Evangelicals to other Christian denominations in the Philippines.

Note: the table depicted above shows the Evangelical percentages in Philippines prior to the year 2000. Philippines’ Christian population most likely had increased or decreased over the years.

Filipino Evangelical Organizations and churches 

Filipino Evangelical churches have expanded over the years, most notably The Evangelical Church Diaspora (TECD), formerly The Evangelical Church of Dubai. The TECD includes some Indian converts.

References

External links 
 De Leon, Cate (2012-12-22). The Philippine Star
 2011-03-19 Retrieved 2013-09-26 ABS-CBN News
 CIA. Retrieved 2013-12-9 The World Factbook
 Riccaliolio. 2015-04-9  Irreligion in the Philippines